A by-election was held for the New South Wales Legislative Assembly electorate of West Sydney on 30 December 1870 because John Robertson was appointed Colonial Secretary and William Windeyer was appointed Solicitor General in the third Martin ministry. Such ministerial by-elections were usually uncontested and the other ministers were all re-elected unopposed.

Dates

Result

John Robertson was appointed Colonial Secretary and William Windeyer was appointed Solicitor General in the third Martin ministry.

See also
Electoral results for the district of West Sydney
List of New South Wales state by-elections

References

1870 elections in Australia
New South Wales state by-elections
1870s in New South Wales